Aa Gaya Hero is a 2017 Indian action comedy film directed by Dipankar Senapati starring Govinda in the lead role. Previously titled Abhinay Chakra, it was Govinda's comeback film.

Plot
ACP Ravindra Varma (Govinda) is a daredevil and sincere police officer who has been called in order to nab a dreaded terrorist (Milind Shinde). During his attempts to catch the terrorist, Ravindra Varma realises that there are two ministers (Surendra Pal and Makrand Deshpande) who work hand in glove with the said terrorist.

Besides them, there are two brothers (Murali Sharma and Ashutosh Rana) who form the right hand of the two corrupt ministers. Does the righteous ACP Ravindra Varma manage to bring the crooks to book, or does he become unsuccessful in doing so, is what forms the rest of the film.

Cast
 Govinda as ACP Ravindra Varma
 Ashutosh Rana
 Murli Sharma
 Makarand Deshpande
 Harish Kumar
 Chandrachur Singh
Richa Sharma
 Poonam Pandey as an item number

Promotion

Govinda visited the BSF camp near Najafgarh, Delhi, to promote the film. He got an opportunity to have a conversation with the BSF jawans. He did a lot of activities there, from having lunch to making the jawans dance with their family members. He also promoted the film on The Kapil Sharma Show, where he was joined by his wife and actor Shakti Kapoor, who was shooting nearby and decided to drop in and meet him.

Soundtrack
The soundtrack of the film features seven tracks which was released 15 February 2017.

Release

Aa Gaya Hero was certified U/A by the CBFC on 6 March 2017. The film released in 300 screens on 17 March 2017 all over India along with other releases being Machine and Trapped.

Reception
BookMyShow reviewed the film and wrote, "Catch the film in your nearest theatre to entertain yourself with a two-hour parody of the 90s, with signature Govinda dance moves and hilarious dialogues and action. Take along your friends to experience a laugh riot. However The Times of India gave it 1.5 stars saying "Unfortunately, besides the actor's trademark dance moves, there is nothing worth watching here. The 'hero' might just need to make another comeback soon and hopefully a more 'relevant' one this time."

Box office
Its first-day box office was 23 lakh. It grossed 32 lakh on Saturday and collected 42 lakhs on Sunday. It collected 97 lakhs in its first weekend. It grossed 1.66 crores till Friday. Its second-weekend box office was 17 lakhs taking the film's total to 1.80 crores. Its lifetime domestic collection is 2.78 crores. In America, it had a good opening, collected 10 lakhs on Friday. It grossed 50 lakh in its first overseas weekend. It grossed 12 lakhs in its first week and collected 7 lakhs in its second weekend. Its lifetime overseas was 99 lakhs. It opened well in Malaysia, where it had just 40 screens. Its final box office was 1.39 crores against a budget of 8 crores it was a disaster.

References

External links

2010s Hindi-language films
2017 films
2017 masala films
Fictional portrayals of the Maharashtra Police
Films shot in Mumbai
Indian action comedy films
Indian police films
2010s police procedural films
Hindi-language action films
2017 action films